37 and 39 Jamaica Street is the address of an historic carriage-works in Jamaica Street, Stokes Croft, Bristol.

It was originally built in 1905 as a two-storey building, but a further two floors were later added.

After the hulk  was sold for scrap in 1911, 37 Jamaica street became the home of the Bristol Royal Naval Reserve unit, before moving to the  HMS Flying Fox in the 1920s.

Between 1975 and 2001 it was occupied by Powred Heating & Burner Spares, a local supplier of parts for central heating systems.

Number 37 is currently occupied by Jamaica Street Stores, a bustling, modern, sustainability focused eatery run by Bristol boys, Mitchell Church, Charlie James, Alfie Allen and Lee Peacock. Number 39 is Jamaica Street Artists: a shared studio space for artists.

It has been designated by English Heritage as a grade II listed building.

See also
 Grade II listed buildings in Bristol

References

External links
The Peoples Republic of Stokes Croft
Jamaica Street Artists
Jamaica Street Stores

Grade II listed buildings in Bristol